Senator Cullerton may refer to:

John Cullerton (born 1948), Illinois State Senate
Tom Cullerton (born 1969), Illinois State Senate